Franciscus Cornelis Gerardus "Fred" van der Poel (5 February 1902 – 23 January 1980) was a Dutch military officer, and a football goalkeeper. He played one match for the Netherlands national football team in 1923. During World War II, he was taken prisoner of war by Japan and worked on the Burma Railway. He survived and fought in the Indonesian National Revolution on the Dutch side.

Biography
Van der Poel was born on 5 February 1902 in Surakarta, Java, Dutch East Indies. He played in one match for the Netherlands national football team in 1923 which was a 8–1 victory against France.

In 1921, van der Poel joined the Royal Netherlands East Indies Army. On 14 February 1925, he left for the Dutch East Indies as second lieutenant in the infantry. On 15 August 1942, Captain van der Poel was taken prisoner of war by Japan. He was first sent to No.4 Branch Camp in Batavia. On 25 January 1943, he was shipped from Batavia by Tacoma Maru 2, and arrived in Changi Prison in Singapore on 28 January. On 18 April, he was transferred by train 58 to Camp Nong Pladuk near Ban Pong, Thailand. Camp Nong Pladuk was a transit camp from which prisoners were put to work on the Burma Railway.

Van der Poel survived World War II, however the Indonesian National Revolution started. In 1946, he was promoted Major and stationed at Semarang, Java. In April 1948, he became vice-chairman of the Voetbalbond Batavia. In 1949, the Netherlands recognised Indonesian independence. Therefore, van der Poel was honourably discharged on 25 July 1950, due to the dissolution of the Royal Netherlands East Indies Army.

Van der Poel died on 23 January 1980 in Rotterdam, Netherlands, at the age of 77.

References

External links
 Fred van der Poel at Voetbal Stats (in Dutch)

1902 births
1980 deaths
Dutch footballers
Netherlands international footballers
Association football goalkeepers
People from Surakarta
Royal Netherlands East Indies Army officers
Royal Netherlands East Indies Army personnel of World War II
Burma Railway prisoners